Jacques Scandelari (July 5, 1943 in Dinard, France – June 2, 1999 in Paris, France) was a French film director, screenwriter and producer. He also produced gay pornographic films, under the pseudonym Marvin Merkins.

Career
Jacques Scandelari gained notoriety for his second film Beyond Love and Evil that was loosely adapted from Marquis de Sade’s play Philosophy in the Bedroom. Set in the present day, a cult of depraved hedonists cavort at a remote, elegant mansion. Scandelari often chose the topic of sex, exploring connected themes such as Isolation and social alienation.

New York
In 1977, Scandelari moved to New York City, where he produced the now famous gay pornographic film New York City Inferno. The film is notorious for its grim, documentary-style and its authorized use of songs of the Village People. In 1978 he worked together with La Grande Bouffe actress Florence Giorgetti in the bleak exploitation movie Flashing Lights.

Filmography

External links 

1943 births
1999 deaths
French pornographic film directors
French pornographic film producers
Producers of gay pornographic films
Film directors from Paris